Nowosiółki may refer to the following places:
Nowosiółki, Gmina Sławatycze in Lublin Voivodeship (east Poland)
Nowosiółki, Gmina Zalesie in Lublin Voivodeship (east Poland)
Nowosiółki, Chełm County in Lublin Voivodeship (east Poland)
Nowosiółki, Hrubieszów County in Lublin Voivodeship (east Poland)
Nowosiółki, Gmina Dobrzyniewo Duże in Podlaskie Voivodeship (north-east Poland)
Nowosiółki, Gmina Gródek in Podlaskie Voivodeship (north-east Poland)
Nowosiółki, Siemiatycze County in Podlaskie Voivodeship (north-east Poland)
Nowosiółki, Tomaszów Lubelski County in Lublin Voivodeship (east Poland)
Nowosiółki, Subcarpathian Voivodeship (south-east Poland)
Nowosiółki, Masovian Voivodeship (east-central Poland)
Nowosiółki, Pomeranian Voivodeship (north Poland)
Nowosiółki, West Pomeranian Voivodeship (north-west Poland)